Stroud Township is a township in Monroe County, Pennsylvania, United States. As of 2020, the township had an estimated population of 19,812.

Geography
According to the United States Census Bureau, the township has a total area of 31.5 square miles (81.5 km2), of which 31.2 square miles (80.8 km2)  is land and 0.3 square mile (0.7 km2)  (0.86%) is water.

Demographics

As of the census of 2000, there were 13,978 people, 5,174 households, and 3,880 families residing in the township.  The population density was 448.2 people per square mile (173.0/km2).  There were 5,935 housing units at an average density of 190.3/sq mi (73.5/km2).  The racial makeup of the township was 86.33% White, 6.87% African American, 0.19% Native American, 1.66% Asian, 0.01% Pacific Islander, 2.90% from other races, and 2.05% from two or more races. Hispanic or Latino of any race were 7.36% of the population.

There were 5,174 households, out of which 34.1% had children under the age of 18 living with them, 62.7% were married couples living together, 8.1% had a female householder with no husband present, and 25.0% were non-families. 19.8% of all households were made up of individuals, and 8.5% had someone living alone who was 65 years of age or older.  The average household size was 2.69 and the average family size was 3.10.

In the township the population was spread out, with 25.8% under the age of 18, 6.3% from 18 to 24, 27.4% from 25 to 44, 26.4% from 45 to 64, and 14.2% who were 65 years of age or older.  The median age was 39 years. For every 100 females, there were 97.1 males.  For every 100 females age 18 and over, there were 93.2 males.

The median income for a household in the township was $53,428, and the median income for a family was $61,349. Males had a median income of $44,621 versus $27,065 for females. The per capita income for the township was $23,460.  About 5.9% of families and 7.1% of the population were below the poverty line, including 8.0% of those under age 18 and 5.1% of those age 65 or over.

Climate

According to the Trewartha climate classification system, Stroud Township has a Temperate Continental climate (Dc) with warm summers (b), cold winters (o) and year-around precipitation (Dcbo). Dcbo climates are characterized by at least one month having an average mean temperature ≤ , four to seven months with an average mean temperature ≥ , all months with an average mean temperature <  and no significant precipitation difference between seasons. Although most summer days are slightly humid in Stroud Township, episodes of heat and high humidity can occur with heat index values > . July is the peak month for thunderstorm activity, which correlates with the average warmest month of the year. The average wettest month is September, which correlates with tropical storm remnants during the peak of the Atlantic hurricane season. Episodes of extreme cold and wind can occur with wind chill values < . The average snowiest month is January, which correlates with the average coldest month of the year. Ice storms and large snowstorms depositing ≥  of snow occur once every couple of years, particularly during nor’easters from December through March.

Transportation

Interstate 80 is the most prominent highway serving Stroud Township. It follows the Keystone Shortway along an east-west alignment through the western and central portions of the township. U.S. Route 209 follows a southwest-northeast alignment through the township, becoming concurrent with I-80 in the middle of the township. U.S. Route 209 Business follows Main Street along a southwest-northeast alignment in the southwestern and central portion of the township. Pennsylvania Route 191 follows a north-south alignment through the middle of the township. Pennsylvania Route 447 follows a southeast-northwest alignment across the northeastern portion of the township, becoming concurrent with PA 191 in the northern part of the township. Pennsylvania Route 611 follows an southeast-northwest alignment through the middle of the township. Finally, Pennsylvania Route 33 briefly enters the western portion of the township before ending at PA 611.

Ecology

According to the A. W. Kuchler U.S. potential natural vegetation types, Stroud Township would have a dominant vegetation type of Appalachian Oak (104) with a dominant vegetation form of Eastern Hardwood Forest (25). The peak spring bloom typically occurs in late-April and peak fall color usually occurs in mid-October.

Notable natives
 John Summerfield Staples (1845–1888), "Substitute" soldier for President Abraham Lincoln in the Union Army during the American Civil War.

References

External links

Stroud Township

Populated places established in 1817
Townships in Monroe County, Pennsylvania
Townships in Pennsylvania